The Trasimeno chub (Squalius albus) is a cyprinid fish endemic to Lake Trasimeno in Italy.

References

Squalius
Fish described in 1838
Taxa named by Charles Lucien Bonaparte